Jerome Lee Williams (born December 4, 1981) is an American former professional baseball pitcher who played 13 seasons in Major League Baseball (MLB) from 2003 to 2016.

He played in Major League Baseball (MLB) for the San Francisco Giants, Chicago Cubs, Washington Nationals, Los Angeles Angels of Anaheim, Houston Astros, Texas Rangers, Philadelphia Phillies and St. Louis Cardinals, and in the Chinese Professional Baseball League (CPBL) for the Uni-President Lions.

Career

San Francisco Giants

Williams was the San Francisco Giants first-round draft pick in the 1999 Major League Baseball Draft, the 39th overall selection. He spent  years in the minors, compiling a record of 27–26 before being called up in 2003. He was a regular starter in the Giants rotation in 2003–2004, going 7–5 with a 3.30 ERA in 2003.

In 2004, Williams started 22 games for the Giants, recording 10 wins with a 4.24 ERA.

In 2005, Williams started 3 games for the Giants before being traded to the Cubs.

Chicago Cubs
He was acquired by the Chicago Cubs along with David Aardsma for LaTroy Hawkins during the 2005 season. In Williams' Cubs debut, he pitched 7 innings, giving up 2 runs and striking out six Milwaukee Brewers players, and ended up going 6–8 for the Cubs. Williams, however, played most of 2006 with the Cubs' Triple-A affiliate, the Iowa Cubs, appearing only in 5 games for the Cubs.

Washington Nationals
On January 12, 2007, Williams was signed by the Washington Nationals organization and in spring training earned a slot in the Nationals starting rotation.

Williams had a rough April for the Nationals, his ERA ballooning to 7.77 before he pitched a brilliant game at the end of the month, pitching six innings of one-hit shut-out ball against the New York Mets. But he sprained his left ankle sliding into second base, and landed on the 15-day disabled list. He came back on May 15, lasting only two innings, allowing five runs on seven hits, and leaving with a rotator-cuff injury. His rehabilitation in the minors did not go well, and after 14 appearances with Double-A Harrisburg, in which he compiled a 9.08 ERA, on August 5, he was released.

Minnesota Twins
On August 8, 2007, he signed a minor league contract with the Minnesota Twins.

Williams, however, struggled mightily with Rochester and in 8 games had an ERA of 9.00 and was let go after the season.

Long Beach Armada
In April , he signed a contract with the Long Beach Armada of the Golden Baseball League.

Los Angeles Dodgers
On June 24, 2008, the Los Angeles Dodgers purchased his contract and he played in their minor league system through the end of the season.

Oakland Athletics
At the end of the minor league season, September 5, 2008, Williams was waived by the Dodgers and then claimed by the Oakland Athletics. Williams did not play for Oakland and was not tendered a contract after the season, making him a free agent. He subsequently re-signed with Oakland and spent 2009 with their top farm club, the Sacramento River Cats of the Pacific Coast League.

Indios de Mayaguez and Uni–President Lions
Williams played winter baseball for the Indios de Mayaguez in Puerto Rico in 2008–09. He played for the Uni-President Lions of CPBL in Taiwan during 2010.

Los Angeles Angels of Anaheim
On June 16, 2011, Williams signed a minor league contract with the Los Angeles Angels of Anaheim. He was assigned to the Triple-A Salt Lake Bees. Williams had his contract purchased on August 16, after recording a 3.91 ERA in 11 games and  innings in Triple-A.

On August 21, 2011, Williams acquired his first major league win since 2005 in his first major league start since 2007. He finished the season with a 4–0 record in 10 games.

In June 2012, Williams had breathing problems and later collapsed in the clubhouse, forcing the Angels to place him on the disabled list. For the first time since his rookie year, Williams spent the whole season in the big leagues. He was a key asset for Anaheim out of the bullpen, being their long man/spot starter. Williams appeared in 32 games, and made 15 starts for the Angels. He compiled a 6–8 record with a 4.58 ERA.

In 2013, Williams made 25 starts for the Angels, appearing in 37 games overall. After recording a 9–10 record with a 4.57 ERA in 2013, Williams was non-tendered by the Angels, making him a free agent.

Houston Astros
On February 6, 2014, Williams signed a one-year contract with the Houston Astros. He was designated for assignment on July 1, 2014. He was released on July 8.

Texas Rangers
On July 11, 2014, Williams inked a minor league deal with the Texas Rangers. He was designated for assignment on August 8.

Philadelphia Phillies
On August 10, 2014, the Philadelphia Phillies claimed Williams off waivers. On September 20, Williams became the first pitcher in MLB history to defeat the same club with three different teams in the same season, defeating the Athletics with the Astros, Rangers, and Phillies. He signed a one-year contract to stay with the Phillies on October 21, 2014.

St. Louis Cardinals
On June 3, 2016, the St. Louis Cardinals signed Williams to Minor League contract. He was immediately added to the rotation of the Memphis Redbirds, their AAA team.

Somerset Patriots
On May 12, 2017, Williams signed with the Somerset Patriots of the Atlantic League of Professional Baseball. On November 1, 2017, he became a free agent.

Acereros de Monclova
On May 4, 2018, Williams signed with the Acereros de Monclova of the Mexican Baseball League.

Retirement
Williams' retirement from baseball was confirmed on December 10, 2018.

Coaching career
On March 8, 2021, Williams was announced as the pitching coach for the St. Lucie Mets, the Low-A affiliate of the New York Mets.

Pitching style
He threw a sinker at 89–93 mph, a four-seam fastball at 90-94 mph, a cut fastball at 87–91 mph, a changeup from 83-86 mph, a slider at 78-83 mph, and a curveball at 70–75 mph.

Personal life
Williams grew up in Waipahu, Hawaii and is a 1999 graduate of Waipahu High School.

He was well known for wearing a puka shell necklace at all times on the playing field, in honor of his mother Deborah, who died of breast cancer in 2001 while he was still a minor league pitcher. He stopped wearing it after a bad start in 2005, but resumed wearing it by spring training of 2007.  He also sported a pink glove whenever he pitched, a symbol for the efforts of finding the cure for breast cancer.

References

External links

1981 births
Living people
Acereros de Monclova players
African-American baseball players
Águilas de Mexicali players
American expatriate baseball players in Mexico
American expatriate baseball players in Taiwan
American baseball players of Japanese descent
American baseball players of Chinese descent
American people of Portuguese descent
American people of Native Hawaiian descent
Baseball players from Honolulu
Chicago Cubs players
Columbus Clippers players
Fresno Grizzlies players
Gigantes de Carolina players
Harrisburg Senators players
Hawaii people of Chinese descent
Houston Astros players
Indios de Mayagüez players
Inland Empire 66ers of San Bernardino players
Iowa Cubs players
Lakewood BlueClaws players
Lancaster Barnstormers players
Las Vegas 51s players
Long Beach Armada players
Los Angeles Angels players
Major League Baseball pitchers
Memphis Redbirds players
Mexican League baseball pitchers
Navegantes del Magallanes players
American expatriate baseball players in Venezuela
Philadelphia Phillies players
Reading Fightin Phils players
Rochester Red Wings players
Round Rock Express players
Sacramento River Cats players
Salem-Keizer Volcanoes players
Salt Lake Bees players
San Francisco Giants players
San Jose Giants players
Shreveport Swamp Dragons players
Somerset Patriots players
Southeastern Louisiana Lions baseball players
St. Louis Cardinals players
Texas Rangers players
Uni-President 7-Eleven Lions players
Washington Nationals players
21st-century African-American sportspeople
20th-century African-American people